The women's 400 metre individual medley event at the 2016 Summer Olympics took place on 6 August at the Olympic Aquatics Stadium.

Summary
Four years after narrowly missing the podium in London, Hungary's Katinka Hosszú, nicknamed the "Iron Lady", opened her redemptive Games by dominating the 400 m individual medley with a new world record and the first title of her Olympic career. Dominating the race from the very start, she pulled away from the field to a gold-medal finish with a 4:26.36. Hosszú's swim also demolished the world record of 4:28.43, set by China's Ye Shiwen at the previous Games. Trailing the leader by almost five seconds, U.S. swimmer Maya DiRado turned ahead of the world-record pace for over half the race, and managed to finish with a silver in 4:31.15. Meanwhile, Spain's Mireia Belmonte rounded out the podium with a bronze in 4:32.39, edging out Great Britain's Hannah Miley (4:32.54) in a tight battle to fourth by 0.15 of a second.

Canada's Emily Overholt finished fifth with a 4:34.70, and was shortly followed by London 2012 runner-up Elizabeth Beisel of the United States (4:34.98). Miley's teammate Aimee Willmott (4:35.04) and Japan's Sakiko Shimizu (4:38.06) rounded out the final.

Reigning Olympic champion Ye Shiwen missed a chance to defend her title in the final, after finishing twenty-seventh out of thirty-three swimmers in the prelims.

The medals for the competition were presented by Mikee Cojuangco-Jaworski, Philippines, IOC member, and the gifts were presented by Husain al-Musallam, First Vice President of the FINA.

Records
Prior to this competition, the existing world and Olympic records were as follows.

The following records were established during the competition:

Competition format

The competition consisted of two rounds: heats and a final. The swimmers with the best 8 times in the heats advanced to the final. Swim-offs were used as necessary to break ties for advancement to the next round.

Results

Heats

Final

References

Women's 00400 metre individual medley
Olympics
2016 in women's swimming
Women's events at the 2016 Summer Olympics